Lawnside is a borough in Camden County, in the U.S. state of New Jersey. Lawnside was developed in 1840 and incorporated in 1926 as the first independent, self-governing black municipality north of the Mason–Dixon line. The United Parcel Service has a large depot in the borough. As of the 2020 United States census, the borough's population was 2,955, an increase of 10 (+0.3%) from the 2010 census count of 2,945, which in turn reflected an increase of 253 (+9.4%) from the 2,692 counted in the 2000 census.

In 2021, the borough had the 25th-highest property tax rate in New Jersey, with an equalized rate of 4.213% in 2020, compared to 3.470% in the county as a whole and a statewide average of 2.279%.

History

The land that was developed as Lawnside was purchased in 1840 by abolitionists for a community for freed and escaped slaves, as well as other African Americans.

Earlier known as "Snow Hill" and "Free Haven", the borough was named for the train station constructed by the Reading Railroad along the Atlantic City Railroad in 1907.

On April 20, 1926, an "Official Special Election" was held in the Borough of Lawnside. Just one month earlier, on March 24, 1926, Governor of New Jersey A. Harry Moore signed into law New Jersey General Assembly Bill 561, dissolving Centre Township, of which Lawnside was a part, and incorporating the Borough of Lawnside, which also included portions of the borough of Barrington. With its first election, Lawnside became the first independent self-governing African American community north of the Mason–Dixon line.

Geography
According to the United States Census Bureau, the borough had a total area of 1.43 square miles (3.70 km2), all of which was land.

Lawnside borders the Camden County municipalities of Barrington, Cherry Hill, Haddonfield, Magnolia, Somerdale, Tavistock and Voorhees Township.

Demographics

2010 census

The Census Bureau's 2006–2010 American Community Survey showed that (in 2010 inflation-adjusted dollars) median household income was $56,006 (with a margin of error of +/− $5,232) and the median family income was $58,790 (+/− $6,229). Males had a median income of $46,705 (+/− $9,519) versus $43,239 (+/− $9,333) for females. The per capita income for the borough was $25,086 (+/− $3,210). About 12.3% of families and 12.7% of the population were below the poverty line, including 15.7% of those under age 18 and 10.1% of those age 65 or over.

2000 census
As of the 2000 United States census there were 2,692 people, 1,026 households, and 700 families residing in the borough. The racial makeup of the borough was 93.61% African American, 1.75% White, 1.00% Native American, 0.52% Asian, 0.07% Pacific Islander, 0.48% from other races, and 2.56% from two or more races. Hispanic or Latino of any race were 2.38% of the population.

There were 1,026 households, out of which 23.5% had children under the age of 18 living with them, 40.1% were married couples living together, 22.4% had a female householder with no husband present, and 31.7% were non-families. 28.4% of all households were made up of individuals, and 14.6% had someone living alone who was 65 years of age or older. The average household size was 2.62 and the average family size was 3.23.

In the borough the population was spread out, with 23.3% under the age of 18, 7.4% from 18 to 24, 22.7% from 25 to 44, 27.8% from 45 to 64, and 18.8% who were 65 years of age or older. The median age was 42 years. For every 100 females, there were 83.4 males. For every 100 females age 18 and over, there were 77.4 males.

The median income for a household in the borough was $45,192, and the median income for a family was $55,197. Males had a median income of $34,881 versus $31,331 for females. The per capita income for the borough was $18,831. About 10.3% of families and 10.7% of the population were below the poverty line, including 16.0% of those under age 18 and 12.1% of those age 65 or over.

As part of the 2000 Census, 93.61% of Lawnside's residents identified themselves as being African American. This was the 30th highest percentage of African American people in any place in the United States with 1,000 or more residents identifying their ancestry and the highest in the Northeastern United States.

Government

Local government
Lawnside is governed under the Borough form of New Jersey municipal government, which is used in 218 municipalities (of the 564) statewide, making it the most common form of government in New Jersey. The governing body is comprised of a Mayor and a Borough Council, with all positions elected at-large on a partisan basis as part of the November general election. A Mayor is elected directly by the voters to a four-year term of office. The Borough Council is comprised of six members elected to serve three-year terms on a staggered basis, with two seats coming up for election each year in a three-year cycle. The Borough form of government used by Lawnside is a "weak mayor / strong council" government in which council members act as the legislative body with the mayor presiding at meetings and voting only in the event of a tie. The mayor can veto ordinances subject to an override by a two-thirds majority vote of the council. The mayor makes committee and liaison assignments for council members, and most appointments are made by the mayor with the advice and consent of the council.

, the Mayor of Lawnside Borough is Democrat Mary Ann Wardlow, whose term of office ends December 31, 2022. Members of the Lawnside Borough Council are Council President Steven Pollard (D, 2022), Ronald De Abreu (D, 2024), Robert Lee (D, 2022), Rhonda Wardlow-Hurley (D, 2023), Eric J. Wilcox Sr. (D, 2023) and Dawn Wright-McLeod (D, 2024).

Eric Wilcox was appointed to fill the seat expiring in December 2020 that had been held by Clifford L. Still. In the November 2018 general election, Wilcox was elected to serve the balance of the term of office.

Federal, state and county representation
Lawnside is located in the 1st congressional district and is part of New Jersey's 5th state legislative district.

Politics
As of March 2011, there were a total of 2,276 registered voters in Lawnside, of which 1,481 (65.1%) were registered as Democrats, 99 (4.3%) were registered as Republicans and 696 (30.6%) were registered as Unaffiliated. There were no voters registered to other parties.

In the 2012 presidential election, Democrat Barack Obama received 97.9% of the vote (1,671 cast), ahead of Republican Mitt Romney with 2.0% (34 votes), and other candidates with 0.1% (2 votes), among the 1,722 ballots cast by the borough's 2,435 registered voters (15 ballots were spoiled), for a turnout of 70.7%. In the 2008 presidential election, Democrat Barack Obama received 96.2% of the vote (1,811 cast), ahead of Republican John McCain, who received around 1.9% (35 votes), with 1,882 ballots cast among the borough's 2,178 registered voters, for a turnout of 86.4%. In the 2004 presidential election, Democrat John Kerry received 92.6% of the vote (1,360 ballots cast), outpolling Republican George W. Bush, who received around 5.4% (79 votes), with 1,469 ballots cast among the borough's 1,989 registered voters, for a turnout percentage of 73.9.

In the 2013 gubernatorial election, Democrat Barbara Buono received 81.8% of the vote (691 cast), ahead of Republican Chris Christie with 17.3% (146 votes), and other candidates with 0.9% (8 votes), among the 887 ballots cast by the borough's 2,423 registered voters (42 ballots were spoiled), for a turnout of 36.6%. In the 2009 gubernatorial election, Democrat Jon Corzine received 88.9% of the vote (984 ballots cast), ahead of both Republican Chris Christie with 5.3% (59 votes) and Independent Chris Daggett with 1.5% (17 votes), with 1,107 ballots cast among the borough's 2,332 registered voters, yielding a 47.5% turnout.

Education
The Lawnside School District serves public school students in kindergarten through eighth grade at Lawnside Public School. As of the 2018–19 school year, the district, comprised of one school, had an enrollment of 321 students and 31.0 classroom teachers (on an FTE basis), for a student–teacher ratio of 10.4:1.

For ninth through twelfth grades, public school students attend Haddon Heights High School, which serves Haddon Heights, and students from the neighboring communities of Barrington and Lawnside who attend the high school as part of sending/receiving relationships with the Haddon Heights School District. As of the 2018–19 school year, the high school had an enrollment of 906 students and 77.5 classroom teachers (on an FTE basis), for a student–teacher ratio of 11.7:1.

Transportation

Roads and highways

The New Jersey Turnpike is the most prominent highway passing through Lawnside. However, there are no exits within the borough, with the nearest ones being Exit 3 in Runnemede/Bellmawr and Exit 4 in Mount Laurel. Interstate 295 also passes through Lawnside, with one partial interchange at Warwick Road. U.S. Route 30 (White Horse Pike) runs through the borough.

Public transportation
NJ Transit offers bus service between Turnersville and Camden, with connecting bus and rail service into Philadelphia on the 403 route.

Notable people

People who were born in, residents of, or otherwise closely associated with Lawnside include:

 Horace J. Bryant (1909–1983), first African American to serve in a State Cabinet position in New Jersey
 Wayne R. Bryant (born 1947), member of the New Jersey General Assembly and State Senate until his conviction on corruption charges
 Ray Fisher (born 1988), actor best known for his role in the 2008 short film The Good, the Bad, and the Confused as Cyborg in Batman v Superman: Dawn of Justice (2016)
 Steve Israel (born 1969), cornerback who played for 10 seasons in the NFL
 Sherron Rolax, achieved public fame when his civil rights were allegedly violated by then New Jersey Governor Christine Todd Whitman in 1996 after police officers had stopped Rolax for suspicious activity in Camden, New Jersey
 Charity Still (–1857), abolitionist, escaped from slavery
 William Still (1821–1902), abolitionist, member of the Pennsylvania Anti-Slavery Society and chairman of its Vigilance Committee, moved here with his family, together with his brothers Peter Still and James Still, and their families

References

External links

 Lawnside Borough website
 Lawnside Public School
 
 School Data for the Lawnside Public School, National Center for Education Statistics

 
1926 establishments in New Jersey
Borough form of New Jersey government
Boroughs in Camden County, New Jersey
Populated places established in 1926
African-American history of New Jersey